Ricardas Beniušis (born 23 April 1980) is a Lithuanian footballer.

Beniušis started his career with Inkaras Kaunas in his homeland, returning there after short spells with Russian clubs Baltika Kaliningrad and Krylya Sovetov Samara. He spent one season in Norway (2002) with Start before again moving back to Lithuania with Atlantas Klaipeda. He joined FBK Kaunas in 2003 and has since won 3 A Lyga titles, two Lithuanian Cups and two Lithuanian Super Cups with the club.

He joined Hearts on a season-long loan deal in July 2007. He made his debut for Hearts in a 1–0 defeat to city rivals Hibernian F.C., playing very poorly and leading to many calling him 'Beniuseless'. He made few starts for Hearts and was sent back to FBK Kaunas early, on 19 March 2008.

In January 2010, he signed for the Israeli club, Hapoel Ra'anana for three years.

References

External links

  Profile at londonhearts.com

1980 births
Living people
Sportspeople from Panevėžys
Association football forwards
Lithuanian footballers
Lithuania international footballers
FBK Kaunas footballers
Heart of Midlothian F.C. players
FC Baltika Kaliningrad players
FK Inkaras Kaunas players
IK Start players
Hapoel Ra'anana A.F.C. players
A Lyga players
Israeli Premier League players
Scottish Premier League players
FC DAC 1904 Dunajská Streda players
Slovak Super Liga players
Eliteserien players
Lithuanian expatriate footballers
Expatriate footballers in Russia
Expatriate footballers in Scotland
Expatriate footballers in Slovakia
Expatriate footballers in Norway
Expatriate footballers in Israel
Lithuanian expatriate sportspeople in Russia
Lithuanian expatriate sportspeople in Scotland
Lithuanian expatriate sportspeople in Slovakia
Lithuanian expatriate sportspeople in Norway
Lithuanian expatriate sportspeople in Israel
PFC Krylia Sovetov Samara players